David Athen Mendenhall (born June 13, 1971) is an American actor. He is best known for his roles in the films Space Raiders, Over the Top, The Transformers: The Movie and They Still Call Me Bruce.

Early life and acting career
Mendenhall was born in Oceanside, California. He has a younger sister, Marissa. Mendenhall began his acting career at the age of four. In 1979, he auditioned for and won the role of Mike Webber on the soap opera General Hospital. He remained with the series until 1986. During that time, Mendenhall started acting in feature films. Mendenhall made his film debut in the 1983 space Western, Space Raiders, produced by Roger Corman. Notable television appearances during the 80s also included playing Elaine Nardo's son on Taxi on three episodes, and playing a 12-year-old drug dealer in “The Reporter”, a very special episode of the sitcom Diff'rent Strokes. The episode featured a guest appearance by then-First Lady Nancy Reagan.

At age 15, Mendenhall portrayed Sylvester Stallone’s son in the 1987 sport drama Over the Top, about a long haul truck driver who tries to win back his alienated son while becoming a champion arm wrestler. That same year, he appeared in the comedy Going Bananas with Dom DeLuise and Jimmie Walker. In 1989, Mendenhall worked on The Secret of the Ice Cave with Sally Kellerman, which was shot in Chile. All three movies were produced by Cannon Films. In 1989, Mendenhall starred opposite Christina Applegate in the drama Streets, once again working with Roger Corman, who produced. On television, Mendenhall had a recurring role for two seasons on the NBC drama Our House, starring Wilford Brimley.

Education and later work
In 1994, Mendenhall  enrolled in the theater arts program at California State University, San Bernardino. In 1996, he transferred to the University of Southern California and graduated magna cum laude in 1998 with a bachelor's degree. Later that year, Mendenhall attended Southwestern Law School, graduating in 2001.

Mendenhall has since worked at the legal departments of several entertainment companies, including NBCUniversal Television Group, and Buena Vista Home Entertainment. From 2007-08, he was the clearance coordinator for the NBC television program Deal or No Deal. Afterwards he worked in the prize department on GSN Live for the Game Show Network, and later as a prize producer for shows on NBC and Fox.

In 2012, he returned to acting with a brief role in Bobcat Goldthwait's God Bless America.

Awards
1984 Soap Opera Digest Award Outstanding Youth Actor in a Daytime Soap Opera for General Hospital
1984 Young Artist Award Best Young Actor in Daytime Soap for General Hospital
1985 Young Artist Award Best Young Actor in a Daytime or Nighttime Television Series for General Hospital
1986 Young Artist Award Outstanding Young Actor - Animation Voice Over for Berenstain Bears
1987 Young Artist Award Exceptional Young Actors in Animation - Series, Specials or Feature Film for Rainbow Brite and the Star Stealer. He was also nominated in the same category for The Transformers: The Movie

Selected filmography

References

External links
 
 

1971 births
20th-century American male actors
21st-century American male actors
American male child actors
American male film actors
American male television actors
American male voice actors
California State University, San Bernardino alumni
Living people
Male actors from California
People from Oceanside, California
Southwestern Law School alumni
University of Southern California alumni
American expatriates in the United Kingdom